The 1927 International cricket season was from April 1927 to August 1927.

Season overview

May

New Zealand in England

June

Wales in England

Test trial in England

July

Scotland in Ireland

August

Foresters in Netherlands

September

New Zealand in Wales

References

1927 in cricket